Andrey Chisti (born 30 March 1983) is a Belarusian former footballer.

Career
A graduate of the Ivatsevichy Sports School, Chisty played football for FC Dinamo Brest and FC Granit Mikashevichi in the Belarusian Premier League.

Honours
Dinamo Brest
Belarusian Cup winner: 2006–07

References

External links

Profile at teams.by

1983 births
Living people
Belarusian footballers
Association football midfielders
FC Dynamo Brest players
FC Granit Mikashevichi players
FC Kobrin players
People from Ivatsevichy District
Sportspeople from Brest Region